Craig Jones (born 1976) is a Welsh former footballer who currently serves as the manager for the George Washington Colonials men's soccer program. Jones played college soccer for George Washington, and served as an assistant manager to the Colonials.

Career

Player 
Jones was also a four-year letterwinner for the Colonials from 1995 until 1998.

Coaching 
Jones served as the Colonials' head assistant manager for three seasons: 2009 through 2011. He served as the Colonials' volunteer assistant from 2002 until 2008.

He has coached the team as the main manager since 2011.

References

External links 
 Craig Jones at George Washington University

Date of birth missing (living people)
1977 births
Living people
Welsh footballers
Association football midfielders
George Washington Colonials men's soccer players
Wales youth international footballers
Welsh expatriate footballers
Welsh expatriate sportspeople in the United States
Expatriate soccer players in the United States
Welsh football managers
George Washington Colonials men's soccer coaches
Welsh expatriate football managers
Expatriate soccer managers in the United States